Gladiolus dichrous is a species of flowering plant found in mountainous regions of South Sudan, Kenya and Uganda. It has relatively small flowers usually hidden under large green or rose coloured bracts.

References

dichrous
Plants described in 1930